Harry Richardson (born 3 March 1993) is an Australian actor, best known for his roles as Drake Carne in Poldark and Frank Gresham in Doctor Thorne. He currently portrays Larry Russell in HBO's The Gilded Age.

Early life and career 
Richardson was born in Sydney, Australia, before moving to London at the age of two. At the age of 12, he then went back to Australia for high school at Sydney Grammar School, where he discovered his love for acting, and then returned to the UK when he was 18. He then did a short course at the Royal Academy of Dramatic Art in London, before enrolling at the Western Australian Academy of Performing Arts in Perth in 2012 Before graduating from WAAPA in 2014, Richardson took a course with Ivana Chubbuck at the 16th Street Acting School in Melbourne.

Richardson's first film was Looking for Grace in which he stars as Jamie. He auditioned for the role of Frank Gresham in the TV series Doctor Thorne when visiting family in London and attended "an audition in the morning before [his] flight back to Australia". He then starred in Poldark, from the third season onward, as Drake Carne. Richardson dated fellow Poldark actor Eleanor Tomlinson for around one year, until they broke up in June 2018. He appeared in the 2017 film Dunkirk "for a second", but described the experience as a "teaser to a dream that I want to actualize". In 2019, he starred in the Australian TV series Total Control as Senator Irving's Adviser Jonathan Cosgrove. He currently portrays Larry Russell in HBO's The Gilded Age.

Filmography

Film

Television

Radio

Theatre

References

External links 

 Agent profile website page
 

1993 births
Living people
Australian male film actors
21st-century Australian actors
Australian male television actors
Western Australian Academy of Performing Arts alumni
Male actors from Sydney